Johannes Dietrich (born 10 February 1985) is a German swimmer who won seven medals at European Short Course Swimming Championships in 2005–2009.

References

1985 births
Living people
German male swimmers
Swimmers from Berlin
20th-century German people
21st-century German people